Henry Vanderglas (born 9 May 1986 in Canberra, ACT) is an Australian rugby union player who currently plays for FC Grenoble , having previously played for the Brumbies and Bristol Rugby. Vanderglas, who plays at flanker, made his debut for the Brumbies during the 2009 Super 14 season.

References

External links
Fiche et Statistiques du joueur sur Métro-Sports
Brumbies profile

Australian rugby union players
Living people
ACT Brumbies players
1986 births
Rugby union players from Canberra
Rugby union flankers